This page presents the results of the women's volleyball tournament at the 1998 Asian Games, which was held from December 7 to December 15, 1998 in Bangkok, Thailand. The women's volleyball event was contested for the tenth time at the Asian Games.

Results

Preliminary round

Pool A

|}

Pool B

|}

Classification 5th–6th

|}

Final round

Semifinals

|}

Bronze medal match

|}

Final

|}

Final standing

References
 Women's Results

Women's volleyball